This is a list of 108 species in the genus Chramesus.

Chramesus species

References

Chramesus